The Pine River is a river in the U.S. state of Rhode Island.  It flows approximately 8 km (5 mi). There are no dams along the river's length.

Course
The river rises in the swamps near the U.S. Naval Reservation in North Kingstown, near Devil's Foot Road. The river continues due east to its confluence with Narragansett Bay at Quonset Point. The last mile of the river is almost entirely buried under the Naval Reservation at Quonset Point. During this last mile, the river provides water to Davol Pond.

Crossings
Below is a list of all crossings over the Pine River. The list starts at the headwaters and goes downstream.
North Kingstown
Navy Drive
Devil's Foot Road (RI 403)
Namcook Road
Post Road (U.S. 1)
Newcomb Road (from here the river goes into a tunnel underneath the Naval Reservation at Quonset Point)

Tributaries
The Pine River has no named tributaries, though there are many unnamed streams that also feed it.

See also
List of rivers in Rhode Island
Narragansett Bay

References

Rivers of Washington County, Rhode Island
North Kingstown, Rhode Island
Rivers of Rhode Island